Ulrike Holzner (born 18 September 1968 in Mainz, Rhineland-Palatinate) is a German former athlete and bobsledder who switched to the latter event in the early 2000s. She won a silver medal in the two-woman event with teammate Sandra Prokoff at the 2002 Winter Olympics in Salt Lake City.

Holzner also won a silver medal in the two-woman event at the 2003 FIBT World Championships in Winterberg.

References
 Bobsleigh two-woman Olympic medalists since 2002
 Bobsleigh two-woman world championship medalists since 2000
 FIBT profile
 

1968 births
Living people
Sportspeople from Mainz
German female bobsledders
German female sprinters
German female long jumpers
Bobsledders at the 2002 Winter Olympics
Olympic bobsledders of Germany
Olympic silver medalists for Germany
Olympic medalists in bobsleigh
Medalists at the 2002 Winter Olympics
21st-century German women